Henrik Otto von Albedyll  (1666 —1738), was a Swedish freiherr and military officer of German Baltic origin. In 1719 he was acting General Governor of Swedish Livonia.

Biography 
Henrik Otto von Albedyl was born in a family of an old German Baltic nobility ( freehold family d'Albedyhll ). Family lost it seat in Swedish House of Nobility due to absence from the country for more than 200 years. He became musketeer at the Rosens regiment in imperial service in 1683, entered as fähnrich (Officer candidate) in Swedish service at Ostrobothnia's regiment 1685, became lieutenant at Mauritz Vellingk regiment in 1687 and captain there in 1689 In the same year he joined William of Orange and participated in Flanders campaigns. In 1691 he became major at Vilhelm of the Saxony-Gotha regiment and participated with this in the Allies' campaign on the Rhine. In 1694, Albedyl became Colonel of the Brandenburg-Kulmbach regiment in the service of the Republic of Venice and proved under the command of Field Marshal Adam Heinrich von Steinau the Italian camps in the following years. He joined the regiment in Saxon service in 1696 and was arrested in Dresden in June 1700 after the Great Nordic War outbreak since he refused to participate in the war against Sweden. At the same time, he was convicted in Sweden of life, honor and goods for failing to obey the order for a position in Swedish service. However, this was soon forgotten, and after having been [Major General] and resigned from Saxon service in March 1702, Albedyl joined the Swedish army in Warsaw May 22, 1702 and followed it during the following campaign there. among other things, he participated in the Battle of Kliszów. Albedyl was laid off to Riga in October of that year and from there went to Hannover in the spring of 1704. On November 9, 1707 he became the chief of Swedish service and head of a recruited German dragon regiment, set up by Henrik Vilhelm von Görtz. He participated in this campaign against Russia in 1707-09 but became a prisoner at Raschovka on February 16, 1709. After being released from Russian captivity on January 18, 1712, Albedyl at Stralsund happened to be in Danish captivity. He became Major General of the Cavalry on November 15, 1712, Major General of the Infantry and commander of the Jönköping Regiment 1714. In 1716 he was released from Danish captivity against the castle, became Lieutenant General of the infantry, and participated in the 1718 Norwegian campaign, during which he was given command of the so-called Warmland Corps. On August 26, 1719, he was appointed governor of Riga, although the city was long occupied by the Russians. He was elevated to a free-standing position on March 2, 1720, resigned from the Swedish service in 1724 and became commander in 1725 in Hamburg.

See also 
Eleonora Charlotta d'Albedyhll

References 

Swedish generals
1666 births
1738 deaths
Swedish Freemasons
Baltic nobility